Hans Albert Nielsen (30 November 1911 – 11 October 1965) was a German film actor. He appeared in more than 130 films between 1937 and 1965.

Biography
Hans Albert Nielsen was born in Hamburg, Germany. He first got an education in business, but afterward, began taking private acting lessons from Albrecht Schoenhals and Erich Ziegel. He made his stage debut in Hamburg in 1932, after which he worked in Augsburg, Kiel, Leipzig, Berlin, Munich and Düsseldorf. Many actors and performing artists fled Nazi Germany, but Nielsen remained. He made his film debut in 1937 in Daphne and the Diplomat, followed by German movies, such as Heimat (with Zarah Leander), Friedrich Schiller – The Triumph of a Genius (with Horst Caspar) and The Great King (with Otto Gebühr).

After World War II, Nielsen performed in a Kabarett group, Die Außenseiter ("The Outsider") and played in revues by cabaret artist Günter Neumann. He resumed his successful film acting career in 1947, appearing in In Those Days, a drama by Helmut Käutner. He often played roles that were good-natured, likeable and elegant, such as the presiding judge in the 1953 satire Hocuspocus with Curt Goetz; the criminal defense attorney in Confess, Doctor Corda; a police inspector with Christopher Lee in Sherlock Holmes and the Deadly Necklace; the police chief in Scotland Yard Hunts Dr. Mabuse and a judge in The Juvenile Judge, with Heinz Rühmann. He also worked with Curd Jürgens and Lilo Pulver in a film version of Conrad Ferdinand Meyer's Gustav Adolf's Page. He also appeared in a few Karl May films and in Edgar Wallace's The Indian Scarf, Das Phantom von Soho and The Door with Seven Locks. His only Hollywood film was Town Without Pity (1961) with Kirk Douglas.

In addition to his own film roles, in 1948, Nielsen began working as a voice actor, dubbing films into German, including Fred Astaire (Funny Face and Daddy Long Legs); Gary Cooper (Cloak and Dagger, among others); Errol Flynn (The Adventures of Robin Hood, Adventures of Don Juan, among others); Cary Grant (Crisis); Rex Harrison (Cleopatra); Phil Silvers (Cover Girl); David Niven (The King's Thief, among others), Tyrone Power (The Mark of Zorro and Prince of Foxes, among others); James Stewart (in The Philadelphia Story and Anatomy of a Murder, among others); Robert Taylor (Quo Vadis), Spencer Tracy (Malaya); Orson Welles (Citizen Kane) and Trevor Howard (The Third Man).

Selected filmography

 Daphne and the Diplomat (1937) – Achim Hell
 Tango Notturno (1937) – Billy Sefton – Fliegeroffizier
 The Mystery of Betty Bonn (1938) – Jack Winsloe – Schriftsteller
 Heimat (1938) – Max von Wendlowsky
 Red Orchids (1938) – Antonio – Marias Bruder
 Freight from Baltimore (1938) – Kurt Engström
 The Green Hell (1938) – Kapitän Murray
 A Prussian Love Story (1938) – Kronprinz Friedrich Wilhelm – sein Sohn
 Uproar in Damascus (1939) – Hauptmann Schulz
 Fasching (1939) – Martin
 Dein Leben gehört mir (1939)
 Alarm at Station III (1939) – Hauptmann Karsten
 Mein Mann darf es nicht wissen (1940) – Willi Ulbrich
 Trenck, der Pandur (1940) – Laudon
 Falstaff in Vienna (1940) – Otto Nicolai
 Friedrich Schiller – The Triumph of a Genius (1940) – Student Scharffenstein
 Ich klage an (1941) – Dr. Höfer
 The Great King (1942) – Niehoff
 Die Nacht in Venedig (1942) – Dr. Nikolaus Roll, genannt Niki, Kaufmann
 Titanic (1943) – 1st Officer Petersen
 I'll Carry You in My Arms (1943) – Dr. Hermnann Hartung
 Leichtes Blut (1943) – Professor Faber
 Um neun kommt Harald (1944) – Lawyer Dr. Tromsa
 Music in Salzburg (1944) – Dr. Franz Mädler
 Der Engel mit dem Saitenspiel (1944) – Bernhard Zoller
 Dr. phil. Doederlein (1945)
 Der Scheiterhaufen (1945)
 In Those Days (1947) – Wolfgang Grunelius / 2. Geschichte
 King of Hearts (1947) – König Peter Petroni
 Chemistry and Love (1948) – Dr. Alland
 Unser Mittwochabend (1948) – Georg
 Die kupferne Hochzeit (1948) – Otto
 Das kleine Hofkonzert (1948) – Leutnant Walter von Arneck
 Heimliches Rendezvous (1949) – Schulrat
 Keepers of the Night (1949) – Pfarrer Johannes Heger
 Five Suspects (1950) – Kriminalrat Thomsen
 Crown Jewels (1950) – Willroy
 Die Tat des Anderen (1951) – Schriftsteller Mönk
 Das späte Mädchen (1951) – Dr. Hans Ahlgrimm
 All Clues Lead to Berlin (1952) – Kriminalrat Dr. Wangen
 The Blue Hour (1953) – Paul
 Hocuspocus (1953) – Gerichtspräsident
 The Divorcée (1953) – Lucas
 Secretly Still and Quiet (1953) – Harry Vondenhoff
 Die heilige Lüge (1954)
 The First Kiss (1954) – Escher
 Hochstaplerin der Liebe (1954) – Dr. Peter Krüger
 Geliebtes Fräulein Doktor (1954) – Direktor Dr. Franke
 Stopover in Orly (1955) – Eugène Boreau
 My Children and I (1955) – Wilhelm Roecker
 Roman einer Siebzehnjährigen (1955) – Eduard Schenk
 Devil in Silk (1956) – Dr. Zacharias
 Die wilde Auguste (1956) – Direktor Roland
 Vergiß wenn Du kannst (1956) – Kunstmaler Bastian Weghart
 Before Sundown (1956) – Dr. Steynitz, Sanitätsrat
 Hochzeit auf Immenhof (1956) – Pankraz
 My Brother Joshua (1956) – Der Pfarrer
 Kleines Zelt und große Liebe (1956) – Karins Vater
 A Heart Returns Home (1956) – Martin Thomas
 Die liebe Familie (1957) – Karl Lang
 Made in Germany (1957)
 Queen Louise (1957) – Hardenberg
 Glücksritter (1957) – Dr. Dreher
 Tolle Nacht (1957) – Mr. Vanderbilt
 Anders als du und ich (1957) – Max Mertens
 Von allen geliebt (1957) – Dr. Johannes Fürst
 At the Green Cockatoo by Night (1957) – Eduard Reichmann, Onkel
  (1957) – Helmut Jäger
 Zwei Matrosen auf der Alm (1958)
 Two Hearts in May (1958) – Direktor Leisemann
 Heart Without Mercy (1958) – Dr. Waagemann
 Confess, Doctor Corda (1958) – Lawyer Dr. Nagel
 Schmutziger Engel (1958) – Direktor Schorlemmer
 Man in the River (1958) – Egon Iversen
 The Girl from the Marsh Croft (1958) – Amtmann Lindgren
 That Won't Keep a Sailor Down (1958) – Pastor Paulsen
  (1958) – Otto Vogelsang
 I'll Carry You in My Arms (1958) – Dr. Compagnuolo
  (1959) – (uncredited)
 The Scarlet Baroness (1959) – Professor Reimer
 Court Martial (1959) – Dr. Wilhelmi, Defense Lawyer
 Verbrechen nach Schulschluß (1959) – Landgerichtsdirektor Dr. Senftenberg
 The Forests Sing Forever (1959) – Major Barre
 The Blue Sea and You (1959) – Direktor Heidebrink
 Love Now, Pay Later (1959) – Bernbeil, ein Industrieller
 Heimat – Deine Lieder (1959) – Pauls Vater
 Bei der blonden Kathrein (1959) – Der baron
 Adorable Arabella (1959) – Vater Hagemann
 The Juvenile Judge (1960) – District Court President Dr. Otto Schmittler
 Mistress of the World (1960) – Colonel Dagget
 I Learned That in Paris (1960) – Professor Giselius
 Die zornigen jungen Männer (1960) – Pflueger
 Freddy and the Melody of the Night (1960) – Direktor Wendlandt
 The Inheritance of Bjorndal (1960) – Major a.D. Barre
 Mal drunter – mal drüber (1960) – Herr Kronsdorf
  (1960) – Pappi
 Gustav Adolf's Page (1960) – Bürgermeister Leublfing
 Town Without Pity (1961) – Karl Steinhof
 You Must Be Blonde on Capri (1961) – Bernard Wagner
 Barbara (1961) – Mikkelsen
  (1961) – Narrator (voice)
  (1962) – Gerichtspräsident
 Eheinstitut Aurora (1962) – Dr. Burgmüller, Anwalt
 The Door with Seven Locks (1962) – Mr. Haveloc
 Doctor Sibelius (1962) – Dr. Reinhardt
 So toll wie anno dazumal (1962) – Brenders
  (1962) – Chefportier Jenner
 The Brain (1962) – Immerman
 Sherlock Holmes and the Deadly Necklace (1962) – Inspector Cooper
 His Best Friend (1962) – Direktor Imhoff
 Only a Woman (1962) – Dr. Katz, Nervenarzt
 Dr (1962) – Dr. Rajser
 Storm Over Ceylon (1963) – Professor Ferlach
 The Strangler of Blackmoor Castle (1963) – Tavish
 The Indian Scarf (1963) – Mr. Tilling
 Scotland Yard Hunts Dr. Mabuse (1963) – Chef von Scotland Yard
 Die Nacht am See (1963)
 The Phantom of Soho (1964) – Lord Harald Malhaus
 Destination Death (1964) – Major a. D. Friedrich Hackländer
 Old Shatterhand (1964) – Gen. Taylor (voice, uncredited)
 Ein Frauenarzt klagt an (1964) – Dr. Kraus
 The Monster of London City (1964) – Dorne
 Bullets Don't Argue (1964) – Rev. Alvarez
 The Seventh Victim (1964) – Reverend Turner
 100 Horsemen (1964) – Alfonso Ordoñez, alcalde
 The Treasure of the Aztecs (1965) – Don Pedro Arbellez
 Hotel der toten Gäste (1965) – Inspector Forbesa
The Pyramid of the Sun God (1965) – Don Pedro Arbellez
 Five Thousand Dollars on One Ace (1965) – Juez Keystone
 The Hell of Manitoba (1965) – Mayor

References

External links

 Photos of Hans Nielsen Virtual History

1911 births
1965 deaths
German male film actors
Male actors from Hamburg
20th-century German male actors